Sky Alps is an Italian airline which operates flights at Bolzano Airport in the autonomous province of South Tyrol. The airline's fleet consists of four De Havilland Canada Dash 8-400 aircraft leased from Chorus Aviation Capital. The airline is a subsidiary of Fri-El Green Power, an Italian company focusing on renewable energy.

History
The airline was founded by South Tyrolean entrepreneur Josef Gostner, who was part of ABD Holdings, a company that purchased Bolzano Airport from the South Tyrol government in 2019. The airline originally intended to commence operations in May 2020 with one daily flight between Bolzano and Rome, along with further connections to Vienna and Munich afterwards and charter flights to southern Italy during the summer season. However, it delayed the start of operations to June 2021 due to the impact of border closures associated with COVID-19.

The airline operated its first flights on 17 June 2021 to Olbia and Ibiza. It commenced twice-weekly flights between Bolzano and Berlin Brandenburg Airport on 30 June. It resumed operations on 15 December. The airline offers 13 weekly flights from Bolzano within its winter 2021 schedule.

Destinations
As of December 2022, SkyAlps operates from Bolzano Airport to Berlin, Düsseldorf, Hamburg and seasonal destinations. It primarily operates leisure flights with a focus on tourists travelling to ski resorts in South Tyrol. It is the first airline to operate scheduled services from Bolzano Airport after Darwin Airline suspended its flights between Bolzano and Rome's Fiumicino Airport in 2015, although Austrian Airlines has operated charter flights from Bolzano since then. Flights are operated by Luxwing, a Maltese charter airline. From 21 December 2022 until mid April SkyAlps flies between Bolzano and Antwerp International Airport.

Fleet

As of January 2023, the SkyAlps fleet consists of the following aircraft, all under Maltese registrations (9H):

References

External links 

 

2020 establishments in Italy
Airlines established in 2020
Airlines of Italy
Companies based in South Tyrol
Italian brands